USS Massachusetts (SSN-798), is a  nuclear powered attack submarine currently being built for the United States Navy. She is the twenty-fifth boat of the class and the eighth vessel to be named for the U.S. state of Massachusetts. Then Secretary of the Navy, Ray Mabus, announced the name on 8 November 2015 in an opinion piece for The Boston Globe. She is the first vessel to be named after the Commonwealth since the now-preserved battleship  was decommissioned in 1947. 

Massachusetts was part of a $17.6 billion contract awarded by the U.S. Navy to prime contractor General Dynamics Electric Boat to construct ten Virginia-class submarines. Her keel was laid 11 December 2020 at Newport News in a virtual ceremony because of the COVID-19 pandemic.

References

 

Virginia-class submarines
Submarines of the United States Navy
Submarines of the United States